Daniel Scott McLellan (born February 10, 1963) is a Canadian former professional ice hockey player who played two games in the National Hockey League with the Boston Bruins during the 1982–83 season, on December 4 and 5, 1982. The rest of his playing career, which lasted from 1982 to 1985, was mainly spent in the American Hockey League.

As a youth, McLellan played in the 1975 and 1976 Quebec International Pee-Wee Hockey Tournaments with minor ice hockey teams from Toronto.

McLellan was a Boston Bruins scout from 1994 to 1999.

For 18 years, Scott was V.P. Sales & Marketing at Tridel Corporation.  He is currently Senior V.P. at Plazacorp, Toronto, one of Canada's leading condominium developers.

Career statistics

Regular season and playoffs

References

External links
 

1963 births
Living people
Canadian ice hockey right wingers
Boston Bruins draft picks
Boston Bruins players
Boston Bruins scouts
Hershey Bears players
Niagara Falls Flyers players
Peterborough Petes (ice hockey) players
St. Michael's Buzzers players
Ice hockey people from Toronto
Toledo Goaldiggers players